Henry John Simonds  (23 March 182825 January 1896) was an English first-class cricketer and barrister.

The son of William May Simonds, he was born at Caversham in March 1828. He was educated at Eton College, before going up to King's College, Cambridge. While studying at Cambridge, he played two first-class cricket matches for Cambridge University Cricket Club, against Cambridge Town Club at Fenner's in 1849 and in The University Match against Oxford University at Oxford in 1850. He had little success in these two matches, scoring just 5 runs. He was a fellow of King's College from 1849 to 1858.

A student of the Inner Temple, he was called to the bar in January 1853 to practice on the Western Circuit. He was appointed a justice of the peace for Oxfordshire in January 1868. He was a partner in the family brewing business, H & G Simonds Ltd, which was named by his father after him and his brother, George. He was active in local politics and was a Chairman of his local Conservative Association. Simonds died at his residence in Caversham in January 1896.

References

External links

1828 births
1896 deaths
People from Caversham, Reading
People educated at Eton College
Alumni of King's College, Cambridge
Fellows of King's College, Cambridge
English cricketers
Cambridge University cricketers
Members of the Inner Temple
English justices of the peace
English brewers
English barristers